In 1945, in the still existing Democratic Federal Yugoslavia, football once again began to be played nationally after a six-year hiatus due to World War II. 

The first post-war national tournament was a hastily organized week-long competition in cup format from September 3 until September 9, 1945. Each federal unit (socialist republic) within FPR Yugoslavia gathered a representative team. There were six teams representing Bosnia and Herzegovina, Croatia, Montenegro, Macedonia, Serbia and Slovenia, one team representing the autonomous region within Serbia, Vojvodina, and the final team being the Yugoslav People's Army (Jugoslovenska Narodna Armija, JNA) football team.

Cup

Quarter finals

Semi finals

Finals

competition top scorer: Stjepan Bobek (JNA) - 8 goals from 3 matches

Champions
SERBIA 

(Coach: Svetozar Glišović)

Srđan MrkušićLjubomir LovrićMiomir PetrovićMiodrag JovanovićMilovan Ćirić (c)Ljubiša FilipovićMilan KrstićBranko StankovićRadovan DomaćinMilivoje ĐurđevićKosta TomaševićJovan JezerkićRajko MitićNikola PerlićAleksandar PanićMomčilo ŠapinacVladimir PečenčićĐura HorvatinovićMiodrag SavićD. Jovanović

See also
Yugoslav Cup
Yugoslav League Championship
Football Association of Yugoslavia

External links
Yugoslavia Domestic Football Full Tables

1